Grewcock is a surname. Notable people with the surname include:

Danny Grewcock (born 1972), English rugby union footballer
George Grewcock (1862–1922), English cricketer
Neil Grewcock (born 1962), English footballer

English-language surnames